Jay C. Martin (born October 8, 1969) is an American attorney and politician who served as a member of the Arkansas House of Representatives for the 40th district from 2003 to 2007. In 2005, Martin served as majority leader of the House.

Early life and education 
Martin was born in Little Rock, Arkansas in 1969. Martin had a mentally ill father and was raised in North Little Rock. In 1992 he earned a Bachelor of Arts degree from the University of Arkansas at Little Rock. Four years later, Martin earned Juris Doctor from the University of Arkansas School of Law.

Career 
Since 1997, Martin has worked as an attorney at James R. Wallace and Associates. He was elected to the Arkansas House of Representatives in November 2002 and assumed office in January 2003. He left office in 2007. Martin serves as the president of Wallace, Martin Duke & Russell.

2022 Arkansas gubernatorial election 
On February 8, 2022, Martin announced that he would run for governor of Arkansas in the 2022 Arkansas gubernatorial election. Martin campaigned as a pro-life Democrat. He lost a primary to Chris Jones.

Personal life 
Martin and his wife, Dawn, have three children. He is an ordained minister of the Assemblies of God.

References 

1969 births
Arkansas lawyers
American Pentecostals
Living people
Democratic Party members of the Arkansas House of Representatives
People from Little Rock, Arkansas
People from North Little Rock, Arkansas
Politicians from Little Rock, Arkansas
University of Arkansas School of Law alumni